= Carpatho-Rusyn American =

- Editor: Patricia A. Krafcik
- Frequency: Quarterly
- Publisher: Carpatho-Rusyn Research Center (U.S.)
- Founded: 1976
- Final issue: 1996
- Country: USA
- Based in: Fairfax, Virginia
- Language: English
- Website: http://www.carpatho-rusyn.org/cra/
- ISSN: 0749-9213
- OCLC: 5388929

Carpatho-Rusyn American was a magazine of the culture and history of Rusyn speaking peoples and their descendants in the United States and Europe. The magazine was published between 1976 and 1996. It was headquartered in Fairfax, Virginia.
